Cilurnum or Cilurvum was a fort on Hadrian's Wall mentioned in the Notitia Dignitatum. It is now identified with the fort found at Chesters (also known as Walwick Chesters to distinguish it from other sites named Chesters in the vicinity) near the village of Walwick, Northumberland, England. It was built in 123 AD, just after the wall's completion.

Cilurnum is considered to be the best preserved Roman cavalry fort along Hadrian's Wall. The site is now preserved by English Heritage as Chesters Roman Fort. There is a museum on the site, housing finds from the fort and elsewhere along the wall.

Construction
The site guarded a bridge, Chesters Bridge, carrying the Military Way Roman road behind the wall across the River North Tyne. Massive abutments survive of this bridge across the river from the fort. Cilurnum was a cavalry fort at its foundation, for retaliatory raids into barbarian areas north of the wall, then given over to infantry later. Hadrian himself encouraged the "Cult of Disciplina" among legions stationed at the wall, and an early inscription on an altar dedicated to Disciplina, found in 1978, indicates the earliest known military presence was a wing of cavalry, ala Augusta ob virtutem appellata ("named Augusta because of its valour"). Inscriptions have also been found showing the Cohors I Delmatarum, from present-day Bosnia-Herzegovina (Yugoslavia), and the Cohors I Vangionum Milliaria Equitata from Upper Rhineland in Germany were also stationed here.

Four large Roman columns, believed to come from Cilurnum, may be seen supporting the south aisle in the church of St Giles at Chollerton, a couple of miles upstream from the fort.

Excavation
In the early 19th century Nathaniel Clayton, owner of Chesters House and Estate, moved hundreds of tons of earth to cover over the last remains of the fort as part of his parkland landscaping, thereby creating a smooth uninterrupted grassland slope down to the River Tyne; However, he collected, before they disappeared, a number of Roman artefacts which he preserved in the family.

His son John Clayton, a noted antiquarian, when he inherited the estate in 1832, with a crew of workmen, undid his father's landscaping, exposing the fort, excavating the ruins, and establishing a small museum for the finds. John Clayton also purchased and made excavations at Housesteads Fort, Carrawburgh Mithraic Temple, and Carvoran, and other historic sites.

Museum
The museum was commissioned in 1895 and opened in 1903. It is a grade II* listed building and was designed by Richard Norman Shaw. It displays part of John Clayton's collection of Roman finds.

Curators
Until 1950 there was no curator of the Clayton Collection, only a caretaker, paid for by the Keith family. Between 1950 and 1972 Grace Simpson was the Honorary Curator of the Collection, and spent a great deal of time working on the Collection, in particular the material excavated by her father, F. G. Simpson. When she left, Dr David J. Smith, who at the time was the keeper at the Museum of Antiquities held the position until 1987. Lindsay Allason-Jones became a trustee of the collection in August 1987 and became the then Honorary Curator.

The collection became the responsibility of English Heritage in 1983 and the new post of 'Curator of Hadrian's Wall Museums'. This position was filled briefly by John Dore (1983–1986), Sally Dumner, and then and Bill Hubbard. Georgina Plowright held the position from 1987 until her retirement in 2012 and was responsible for the refurbishment and re-display of the museum as well as the production of an electronic catalogue of the collections. Frances McIntosh is the current Curator of Hadrian's Wall and the North East for English Heritage.

Gallery

See also 
Chesters Bridge
Petrosomatoglyph Male fertility symbol

Sources
Roman Britain
Chesters Roman Fort and Museum - Hadrian's Wall - English Heritage

References

External links

Chesters Roman Fort and Museum - Hadrian's Wall - official site English Heritage
'Chesters Roman for: outpost of empire' on Google Arts & Culture
Cilurnum  at www.Roman-Britain.co.uk

Forts of Hadrian's Wall
Roman fortifications in England
Roman sites in Northumberland
English Heritage sites in Northumberland
Museums in Northumberland
Museums of ancient Rome in the United Kingdom
Archaeological museums in England